Villa del Prado refers to Villa del Prado, a Spanish municipality.

It can also refer to:

Places
 Villa del Prado, Baja California, a Baja California city
 Villa del Prado, Córdoba, a municipality in the province of Córdoba, Argentina.

See also
 Prado (disambiguation)